Tang Kerong (born 7 May 1988) is a road cyclist from China. At the 2009 Asian Cycling Championships she won the time trial and road race.

References

External links
 profile at Procyclingstats.com

1988 births
Chinese female cyclists
Living people
Place of birth missing (living people)
Cyclists at the 2010 Asian Games
Cyclists at the 2014 Asian Games
Asian Games competitors for China
21st-century Chinese women